The Azerbaijan national futsal team is the national futsal team of Azerbaijan and is controlled by the Association of Football Federations of Azerbaijan. It represents Azerbaijan in international futsal competitions such as the FIFA Futsal World Cup and the European Championships. They are ranked 13th in the world, the highest-ranking team from Caucasus in the World Rankings. They are also ranked 7th in Europe on 10 August 2021.

Azerbaijan had never qualified for the FIFA Futsal World Cup until 2016, but they have participated in the last five editions of the European Championship.

History

Recently
Azerbaijan's first appearance at the big level came during the 2010 UEFA Futsal Championship. They were unbeaten in qualifying and finished second to Portugal in their group, and only then after conceding a late equalizer against the 2007 semi-finalists. Alesio has put together a potent blend of naturalized South Americans and local talent like Vitaliy Borisov and the Brazilian coach and much of the Azerbaijan squad are involved with champion club Araz Naxçivan, who in November won through to this spring's four-team UEFA Futsal Cup finals. Despite finishing in fourth place, Azerbaijan's finals run was the best showing by a debutant since the inaugural UEFA Futsal Championship tournament. Azerbaijan's Biro Jade won the Golden Boot award as joint top scorer with five goals.

Tournament records

FIFA Futsal World Cup

UEFA European Futsal Championship

Minor tournament
this table consist of only senior A team Results (not include Youth and club match results)

 Source:
https://web.archive.org/web/20161117212236/http://www.futsalplanet.com/news/news-01.asp?id=720
https://web.archive.org/web/20100118022640/http://futsalplanet.com/agenda/agenda-01.asp?id=7807
https://web.archive.org/web/20100118020423/http://futsalplanet.com/agenda/agenda-01.asp?id=8305
https://web.archive.org/web/20090206223856/http://futsalplanet.com/agenda/agenda-01.asp?id=10230
https://web.archive.org/web/20100106044728/http://www.futsalplanet.com/agenda/agenda-01.asp?id=12027

https://web.archive.org/web/20161108195643/http://www.futsalplanet.com/agenda/agenda-01.asp?id=18825
https://web.archive.org/web/20161117211959/http://www.futsalplanet.com/agenda/agenda-01.asp?id=18981

All time general statistics record/Overview of results
 As a 15 Nov 2016

 Source:https://web.archive.org/web/20161116194204/http://www.futsalplanet.com/matches/index.asp

Players

Current squad
The following players were called up to the squad for the UEFA 2024 FIFA Futsal World Cup qualification matches against Greece and Poland on 3 and 7 March 2023, respectively.
Head coach:  Alesio

Recent call-ups
The following players have also been called up to the squad within the last 12 months.

COV Player withdrew from the squad due to contracting COVID-19.
INJ Player withdrew from the squad due to an injury.
PRE Preliminary squad.
RET Retired from international futsal.

Results and Fixtures

2016

Managers
  Elman Alakbarov (2008–2009)
  Alesio (2009-2014)
  Tino Perez (2014-2016)
  Miltinho (2016-2017)
  Biro Jade (2017-2018)
  Alesio (2018-present)

See also
 Araz Naxçivan
 Azerbaijan national football team
 Baku United

References

Minor tournament Source:
https://web.archive.org/web/20161117212236/http://www.futsalplanet.com/news/news-01.asp?id=720
https://web.archive.org/web/20100118022640/http://futsalplanet.com/agenda/agenda-01.asp?id=7807
https://web.archive.org/web/20100118020423/http://futsalplanet.com/agenda/agenda-01.asp?id=8305
https://web.archive.org/web/20090206223856/http://futsalplanet.com/agenda/agenda-01.asp?id=10230
https://web.archive.org/web/20100106044728/http://www.futsalplanet.com/agenda/agenda-01.asp?id=12027

https://web.archive.org/web/20161108195643/http://www.futsalplanet.com/agenda/agenda-01.asp?id=18825
https://web.archive.org/web/20161117211959/http://www.futsalplanet.com/agenda/agenda-01.asp?id=18981

External links
 Official website

 
European national futsal teams
National